Jamie Aliss Moyle (born March 17, 1989) is an American mixed martial artist. She competes in the strawweight division.

Background
Moyle started cardio kickboxing in 2008, eventually falling in love with the sport and progressing towards mixed martial arts. She also studied nursing at University of Nevada.

Mixed martial arts career

Early career
Moyle made her amateur MMA debut in July 2011. Over the next three years she amassed an amateur record of 5 wins against 2 losses. She won a Tuff-n-Uff amateur tournament and was awarded a four-fight contract with Invicta Fighting Championships.

Invicta FC
She made her professional debut against Jenny Liou Shriver at Invicta FC 9: Honchak vs. Hashi on November 1, 2014. She won the fight by unanimous decision. She was awarded a Performance of the Night bonus award.

In her second fight for the promotion, Moyle faced JJ Aldrich at Invicta FC 11: Cyborg vs. Tweet on February 27, 2015. She won the fight via technical submission due to a rear-naked choke in the first round.

In her third fight for the promotion, Moyle faced Amy Montenegro at Invicta FC 13: Cyborg vs. Van Duin on July 9, 2015. She won the fight by split decision. She was awarded a Fight of the Night bonus award.

In her fourth fight for the promotion, Moyle faced Sharon Jacobson at Invicta FC 14: Evinger vs. Kianzad on September 12, 2015. She lost the fight via unanimous decision, the first loss of her professional MMA career. She was awarded a Fight of the Night bonus award.

The Ultimate Fighter
In the elimination bout Moyle defeated Alyssa Krahn via first-round submission and was the second pick of Team Joanna. As the quarter-final bout, Moyle faced Amanda Bobby Cooper. She lost the bout via majority decision and was eliminated from the season.

Ultimate Fighting Championship
In September 2016, it was announced that Moyle had signed with the Ultimate Fighting Championship. In her debut, she faced Kailin Curran at The Ultimate Fighter: Tournament of Champions Finale on December 3, 2016. She won the fight via unanimous decision.

In her second fight for the UFC, Moyle faced Viviane Pereira at UFC 212 on June 3, 2017. She lost the fight by unanimous decision.

Moyle was scheduled to face Maryna Moroz on January 30, 2018 at UFC 220. However, Moyle pulled out of the fight during the week leading up to the event citing an undisclosed injury, and the bout was cancelled.

Moyle faced  Emily Whitmire on July 7, 2018 at UFC 226. She lost the fight via unanimous decision.

On August 30, Moyle was released from UFC.

Return to Invicta
Moyle faced Brianna van Buren on December 15, 2018 at Invicta FC 33: Frey vs. Grusander II. Moyle missed weight by nine pounds, weighing in at 125.1 lbs and forfeiting 25% of her purse to Van Buren. She lost the fight by unanimous decision.

Championships and accomplishments
Invicta Fighting Championships
 Fight of the Night (Two times) vs. Amy Montenegro and Sharon Jacobson
 Performance of the Night (One time) vs. Jenny Liou Shriver

Mixed martial arts record

|-
|Loss
|align=center|4–4
|Brianna van Buren
|Decision (unanimous)
|Invicta FC 33: Frey vs. Grusander II
|
|align=center|3
|align=center|5:00
|Kansas City, Missouri, United States
|
|-
|Loss
|align=center|4–3
|Emily Whitmire
|Decision (unanimous)
|UFC 226 
|
|align=center|3
|align=center|5:00
|Las Vegas, Nevada, United States
|
|-
|Loss
|align=center|4–2
|Viviane Pereira
|Decision (unanimous)
|UFC 212
|
|align=center|3
|align=center|5:00
|Rio de Janeiro, Brazil
|
|-
|Win
|align=center|4–1
|Kailin Curran
|Decision (unanimous)
|The Ultimate Fighter: Tournament of Champions Finale 
|
|align=center|3
|align=center|5:00
|Las Vegas, Nevada, United States
|
|-
| Loss
| align=center| 3–1
| Sharon Jacobson
| Decision (unanimous)
| Invicta FC 14: Evinger vs. Kianzad
| 
| align=center| 3
| align=center| 5:00
| Kansas City, Missouri, United States
| 
|-
| Win
| align=center| 3–0
| Amy Montenegro
| Decision (split)
| Invicta FC 13: Cyborg vs. Van Duin
| 
| align=center| 3
| align=center| 5:00
| Las Vegas, Nevada, United States
| 
|-
| Win
| align=center| 2–0
| JJ Aldrich
| Technical Submission (rear-naked choke)
| Invicta FC 11: Cyborg vs. Tweet
| 
| align=center| 1
| align=center| 2:20
| Los Angeles, California, United States
| 
|-
| Win
| align=center| 1–0
| Jenny Liou Shriver
| Decision (unanimous)
| Invicta FC 9: Honchak vs. Hashi
| 
| align=center| 3
| align=center| 5:00
| Davenport, Iowa, United States
|

Mixed martial arts amateur record

|-
| Win
| align=center| 5–2
| Molly Wren-Holmes
| Decision (unanimous)
| Tuff-N-Uff: 20th Anniversary
| 
| align=center| 3
| align=center| 3:00
| Las Vegas, Nevada, United States
| 
|-
| Win
| align=center| 4–2
| Jianna Denizard
| TKO (punches)
| Tuff-N-Uff: Future Stars of MMA
| 
| align=center| 2
| align=center| 2:31
| Las Vegas, Nevada, United States
| 
|-
| Win
| align=center| 3–2
| Stephanie Alba
| Decision (unanimous)
| Tuff-N-Uff: Future Stars of MMA
| 
| align=center| 3
| align=center| 2:00
| Las Vegas, Nevada, United States
| 
|-
| Loss
| align=center| 2–2
| Delaney Owen
| Decision (unanimous)
| Fighters Source: USA Final Prelims
| 
| align=center| 3
| align=center| 3:00
| Miami, Florida, United States
| 
|-
| Loss
| align=center| 2–1
| Tecia Torres
| Decision (unanimous)
| MMASG: Bone Island Fights
| 
| align=center| 3
| align=center| 3:00
| Key West, Florida, United States
| 
|-
| Win
| align=center| 2–0
| Daynesha Bumangla
| Decision (unanimous)
| Atlas Fights: Cage Rage 9
| 
| align=center| 3
| align=center| 3:00
| Biloxi, Mississippi, United States
| 
|-
| Win
| align=center| 1–0
| Sarah Cook
| Decision (unanimous)
| Breakthrough MMA: Proving Ground 1
| 
| align=center| 3
| align=center| 3:00
| Daytona Beach, Florida, United States
|

See also
List of female mixed martial artists

References

External links
 Fighting Words: Jamie Moyle on InvictaFC.com
 
 

1989 births
American practitioners of Brazilian jiu-jitsu
Female Brazilian jiu-jitsu practitioners
American female mixed martial artists
Strawweight mixed martial artists
Flyweight mixed martial artists
Mixed martial artists utilizing Brazilian jiu-jitsu
Living people
21st-century American women
Ultimate Fighting Championship female fighters